The Agrocampus Rennes (in French called in full École nationale supérieure agronomique de Rennes, meaning "Higher Institution for agricultural sciences of Rennes") was a French grande école created in 1849, training students mostly in the agronomy and life sciences fields.

In 2008, Agrocampus Rennes was merged with Institut National d'Horticulture et de Paysage, another agricultural sciences school located in western France, to create Agrocampus Ouest.

External links
  Official website in French

Rennes
Educational institutions established in 1849
1849 establishments in France
Monuments historiques of Ille-et-Vilaine